Mark Bellofiore (born 13 April 1983 in Melbourne) is an Australian slalom canoeist who competed in the 2000s. Competing in two Summer Olympics, he earned his best finish of seventh in the C2 event in Beijing in 2008.

His partner in the C2 boat was Lachie Milne.

World Cup individual podiums

1 Oceania Championship counting for World Cup points

References

1983 births
Australian male canoeists
Canoeists at the 2004 Summer Olympics
Canoeists at the 2008 Summer Olympics
Living people
Olympic canoeists of Australia
Australian Institute of Sport canoeists
21st-century Australian people